Erick Miller is a CEO, technology entrepreneur and investor who began his career building startups during the dot-com bubble of the late 1990s in San Francisco, California.  Miller is the Founder and CEO of CoinCircle, and founding managing director of Hyperspeed Ventures and the former CEO and Founder of Vergence Labs, a company known for designing and developing wearable computer enabled video streaming glasses under the brand name Epiphany Eyewear as well as augmented reality (AR) and virtual reality (VR) eyewear.

Leaked acquisition 
On November 24, 2014, a hacker group identified itself by the name "Guardians of Peace" (GOP) leaked and released confidential information from the film studio Sony Pictures Entertainment. Aside from major exposure of Sony Pictures business and employee data, information about the confidential acquisition of Miller's Company Vergence Labs' Epiphany Eyewear by Snapchat was revealed. The acquisition of Vergence Labs became public solely as the result of 2014's hack of Sony, including the inbox of Sony Pictures chairman Michael Lynton, a Snapchat board member.

Vergence Labs' main product was Epiphany Eyewear. Following the acquisition, Miller created the venture-capital and investment firm Hyperspeed Ventures in 2014. Miller announced the new venture at Wearable World Congress where he spoke about the future of wearables with augmented reality, virtual reality and artificial intelligence.  During the Wearable World Congress fireside chat, Miller spoke about his vision for the future of the wearable technology industry; although he refused to discuss reports of Vergence Labs being acquired by Snapchat.

Background
At Hyperspeed Ventures, Miller has invested in early-stage technology startups including investments in genetic editing and quantum computing technology companies.

Before starting Hyperspeed, in 2010 Miller began working on prototypes and patents for what would become Vergence Labs and by 2011 the company was officially cofounded, recruiting a founding team largely from Stanford University.  Although Vergence Labs' first major release was the Epiphany Eyewear smart glasses, early in the company's history prototypes for both virtual reality and augmented reality products were developed as the vision and mission of the company.  The Epiphany Eyewear POV social video smart glasses were designed with an embedded camera and computer system within frames similar in style to the wayfarer design.   The design and development of Epiphany Eyewear pre-dated the start of Google Glass by about two years. In late 2013 Epiphany Eyewear began shipping to customers.

Miller is also a published author, speaker and artist who has worked on feature films and spoken at SIGGRAPH and SXSW. His former employers include Digital Domain of Venice, California, Sony Pictures Imageworks of Culver City, California and Walt Disney Animation Studios of Burbank, California.  While at these firms Miller developed technologies for motion picture visuals and digital film making.

When Miller began his career he transitioned from the dot-com startup world after the first company he helped build was acquired in 2001; transitioning into the 3D computer animation industry as he completed an undergraduate degree in the field.  Miller later received an MBA from UCLA Anderson School of Management and another Master's in Business from the National University of Singapore in 2011, at which point he chose to pursue technology entrepreneurship once again.

Published works
Miller is a published author of five books, including:
Hyper-Realistic Creature Creation  
Hyper-Realistic Creature Creation 2nd Edition

Patents
 "Musculo-skeletal shape skinning", granted June 4, 2012 
 "Indirect Binding With Segmented Thin Layers to Provide Shape-Preserving Deformations in Computer Animation", granted November 4, 2009

Filmography
While working in the film industry as a technical director and/or director of technology, Miller worked on the following feature films:
 300
 Spider-Man 3
 X-Men: The Last Stand
 Fantastic Four: Rise of the Silver Surfer
 I, Robot
 The Day After Tomorrow
 Surfs Up
 Bolt

References

External links

Living people
American computer businesspeople
American technology chief executives
American technology company founders
UCLA Anderson School of Management alumni
National University of Singapore alumni
Year of birth missing (living people)